The following lists events that happened during 1947 in North Korea, then governed by the People's Committee of North Korea and the Provisional People's Committee of North Korea.

Incumbents
Chairman:Kim Il Sung

Events
February 24-25 :1947 North Korean local elections
September 19:Amnokgang Sports Club is founded.

References

1940s in North Korea
Years of the 20th century in North Korea
1947 in North Korea